Tourism in Greenland is a relatively young business area of the country. Since the foundation of the national tourist council, Greenland Tourism, in 1992, the Home Rule Government (renamed 'Self Rule Government' in 2009) has been working actively with promoting the destination and helping smaller tourist providers to establish their services. Foreign travel agencies have increasingly been opening up sale of Greenland trips and tours, and the cruise industry has had a relatively large increase in routes to (or passing) Greenland since about the turn of the century.

The country has spectacular scenery  and a few historic sites. The everyday life and local culture of Greenlanders is one of the main experiences for adventure travellers to Greenland.

The main tourist activities on offer are sailing tours among icebergs, dog sledding tours, ice cap treks, wildlife spotting (including whale watching), iceberg watching, and hiking trips to the mainly Norse ruins.

Visit Greenland
Visit Greenland is the Greenland Self-Rule Government agency responsible for tourism in Greenland. The head office is in Nuuk, Greenland. There is a subsidiary office in Copenhagen Denmark.

Visit Greenland was established in 1992. Its original goal was to develop a sustainable tourism industry and market Greenland as a tourism destination. The role was subsequently expanded to include the development of industry and small businesses in Greenland.  Visit Greenland in Nuuk focuses on facilitation and the Copenhagen office focuses on marketing. Visit Greenland has a collaboration with the Danish travel agency Greenland Travel, which is currently the largest tour operator and travel agency specializing in travels to Greenland.

Statistics

Most overnight visitors (Non-Greenlandic) arriving to Greenland in 2016 were from the following countries of nationality:

Greenland Self-Rule Government
In 2002 Greenland (then "Home Rule Government" now "Self-Rule Government") established five focus regions for the development of the tourism industry in Greenland. "Destination North Greenland"  centered on Disko Bay, "Destination Arctic Circle"  centered on Kangerlussuaq, "Destination Capital Region"  centered on the capital Nuuk, "Destination South Greenland"  centered on Qaqortoq, and "Destination East Greenland" in East Greenland with Tasiilaq as the main hub.

The most popular tourist destination is Ilulissat Icefjord, which has been declared a UNESCO World Heritage Site.

Effects of the pandemic

Tourism increased significantly between 2015 and 2019, with the number of visitors increasing from 77,000 per year to 105,000. One source estimated that in 2019 the revenue from this aspect of the economy was about 450 million kroner (US$67 million). Like many aspects of the economy, this slowed dramatically in 2020, and into 2021, due to restrictions required as a result of the COVID-19 pandemic; one source describes tourism as being the "biggest economic victim of the coronavirus". (The overall economy did not suffer too severely as of mid 2020, thanks to the fisheries "and a hefty subsidy from Copenhagen".) Tourism is expected to recover in 2021, and Greenland's goal is to develop it "right" and to "build a more sustainable tourism for the long run".

Points of interest

Ilulissat
 Ilulissat Icefjord - Fjord south of the city declared UNESCO World Heritage Site in 2004
 Jakobshavn Glacier - The most productive glacier in the northern hemisphere
 Sermermiut - An abandoned Inuit settlement in the UNESCO World Heritage Site
 Ilimanaq - A small settlement, former whaling station south of the Icefjord
 Oqaatsut - A small settlement, current whaling station north of Ilulissat
 Knud Rasmussen's Museum - Museum dedicated to the Greenlandic–Danish polar explorer Knud Rasmussen
 Zions Church

Nuuk
 Greenland National Museum
 Kangeq: abandoned fishing village
 Nuuk Art Museum
 Nuuk Cathedral

South Greenland
Narsarsuaq Museum - displays on the Vikings, sheep farming, and the American presence in Southern Greenland
Iceview Plateau Hike - a 5-6 hour hike from Narsaruaq that leads to a high plateau with a lake
 Qaqortoq Museum - main museum of Qaqortoq

External links

References

 
Greenland
Greenland